Frederick William Payn (16 September 1872 – 1908) was a British amateur tennis player at the turn of the 20th century. He reached the quarterfinals of Wimbledon in 1900 and 1902 and the finals of the German International Championships in 1901.

He attended Trinity Hall, Cambridge and was called to the bar at the Inner Temple as a solicitor in 1899.

In addition to legal writings, Payn was also authored the tennis books Tennis Topics and Tactics (1904), Secrets of Lawn Tennis (1906). and Lifting the Veil (1907).

He died in Baku, Russian Empire (now Azerbaijan), in 1908.

Selected publications

Tennis Topics and Tactics (1904, 1907)
The Secrets of Lawn Tennis (1906)
Lifting the Veil (1907)

References

External links

 Secrets of Lawn Tennis (via Google Books)

1873 births
1908 deaths
People from Bickley
Alumni of Trinity Hall, Cambridge
English male tennis players
Date of death missing
British solicitors
British sportswriters
British male tennis players
Tennis people from Greater London